Carels Frères, or Carels Brothers, was a manufacturer of stationary steam engines in Ghent, Belgium. For instance, in 1909, they supplied a 1200 hp tandem compound engine with super heater to Moston Mill, a cotton mill in Moston, North Manchester. It was their works no 875, with cylinders  bore with a  stroke. Developing  at 90 rpm, superheated steam  was supplied by Tetlow boilers. The flywheel,  in diameter, was provided with the sixty rope grooves that the full power would have required. The second half of the mill, however, was never completed, and in 1958 electric drives were installed, and the engine was scrapped.

George Watkins commented that this was typical of continent design. Six or more of Carels' engines were installed in Lancashire mills in the early 20th century.

References
Notes

Bibliography

External links
One Guy from Barlick– Archive of Forum discussing Lancashire mill engines

Defunct manufacturing companies of Belgium
Engineering companies of Belgium
Ghent
Steam engine manufacturers
Textile machinery manufacturers